Jonas Björkman and Todd Woodbridge were the defending champions but only Björkman competed that year with Jared Palmer.

Björkman and Palmer lost in the semifinals to Simon Aspelin and Massimo Bertolini.

Aspelin and Bertolini won in the final 6–7(3–7), 6–0, 6–4 against Lucas Arnold and Mariano Hood.

Seeds

  Jonas Björkman /  Jared Palmer (semifinals)
  Lucas Arnold /  Mariano Hood (final)
  Simon Aspelin /  Massimo Bertolini (champions)
  Devin Bowen /  Ashley Fisher (first round)

Draw

External links
 2003 Synsam Swedish Open Doubles Draw

Men's Doubles
Doubles